The Ozark bass (Ambloplites constellatus) is a species of freshwater fish in the sunfish family (Centrarchidae) of order Perciformes.  It is native only to the White River, Sac River, James River, and Pomme de Terre river drainages of Missouri and Arkansas.the species is commonly referred to as “goggle-eye”.

Description
The Ozark bass is a comparatively slender species of rock bass with a large eye which has a red iris. The brownish-green body has an irregular pattern of black-speckling.

Distribution
The  Ozark bass is native to the Ozarks upland reaches of the White River system in Missouri and Arkansas. They have been introduced elsewhere but have failed to establish populations in these areas.

Habitat and biology
The Ozark bass occurs in creeks and small to medium permanent rivers with high levels of dissolved oxygen, plentiful aquatic vegetation, low turbidity and sand or rocky beds substrates with a preference for clear rocky pools close to the banks, boulders, or submerged wood. Males create nests in gravel or small stone substrates and these normally situated around a metre of cover. The females lay eggs in the nest which the male guards the nest until the fry depart.

Relationship with humans 
They are a popular game fish in small streams and rivers. The IGFA world record for the species is a fiveway tie with fish weighing 0.45 kg (1 lb 0oz) caught from Bull Shoals Lake in Arkansas and the James River in Missouri.

References 

 FishBase: Ambloplites constellatus
 
 Arkansas Game and Fish Commission
 
 https://nature.mdc.mo.gov/discover-nature/field-guide/northern-rock-bass-goggle-eye

Ambloplites
Fauna of the Plains-Midwest (United States)
Freshwater fish of the United States
Fish described in 1977
Taxa named by Robert Cashner
Taxa named by Royal Dallas Suttkus
Endemic fauna of Arkansas